SeaWeb is a nonprofit ocean conservation organization. Their mission is to raise public awareness, to advance science-based solutions and mobilize decision-makers around ocean conservation. SeaWeb was founded in 1996 by the Environment Group of the Pew Charitable Trust as an initiative to promote ocean conservation issues for Americans. In 1999, SeaWeb became an independent 501(c)3 organization, funded mostly from private charitable foundations, but also from individual contributions. In 2015, SeaWeb became part of The Ocean Foundation.

Mission statement
"SeaWeb is the only international, nonprofit organization exclusively dedicated to using the science of communications to fundamentally shift the way people interact with the ocean. We transform knowledge into action by shining a spotlight on workable, science-based solutions to the most serious threats facing the ocean, such as climate change, pollution and depletion of marine life. We work collaboratively with targeted sectors to encourage market solutions, policies and behaviors that result in a healthy, thriving ocean. By informing and empowering diverse ocean voices and conservation champions, SeaWeb is creating a culture of ocean conservation."

Seafood Summit 

The SeaWeb Seafood Summit brings together global representatives from the seafood industry with leaders from the conservation community, academia, government and the media. The goal of the Summit is to define success and advance solutions in sustainable seafood by fostering dialogue and partnerships that lead to a seafood marketplace that is environmentally, socially and economically sustainable. The conference is produced in partnership by SeaWeb and Diversified Communications.

Past Summits have included:

 Seafood Summit 2019 — Bangkok, Thailand
 Seafood Summit 2018, "The World’s Premier Conference on Seafood Sustainability" — Barcelona, Spain
 Seafood Summit 2017 — Seattle, Washington
 Seafood Summit 2016, "Advancing Solutions in Sustainable Seafood" — St. Julian's, Malta
 Seafood Summit 2015, "Seize Opportunity | Create Solutions" — New Orleans, Louisiana
 Seafood Summit 2012, "Evolving Solutions for New Horizons" — Hong Kong
 Seafood Summit 2011, "Responsibility Without Borders?"— Vancouver, Canada
 Seafood Summit 2010, "Challenging Assumptions in a Changing World" — Paris, France
 Seafood Summit 2009, "Sharing Responsibility for Real Change" — San Diego, California
 Seafood Summit 2008, "Global Challenges, Local Solutions" — Barcelona, Spain 
 Seafood Summit 2007, "The Business of Sustainability"  — Jacksonville, Florida
 Seafood Summit 2006, "Sustainability and the Future of Seafood" — Seattle, Washington
 Seafood Summit 2004 — Chicago, Illinois
 Seafood Summit 2003 — Providence, Rhode Island
 Seafood Summit 2002 — Washington, DC

Seafood Champion Awards
The Seafood Champion Awards were started in 2006 to annually recognize individuals and companies for outstanding leadership in promoting environmentally responsible seafood. SeaWeb established the award to honor those in the seafood industry whose past and/or present contributions demonstrate a commitment to innovation that leads to change.

See also
 Seafood Choices Alliance

Notes

External links
 SeaWeb website (archived)
 Seafood Champions website

Fisheries conservation organizations
Marine conservation organizations
Companies established in 1996
1996 establishments in Washington (state)
Environmental awards